The Winnington Baronetcy, of Stanford Court in the County of Worcester, is a title in the Baronetage of Great Britain.

History
Sir Francis Winnington (1634–1700) Solicitor-General to King Charles II, acquired the family seat of Stanford Court, Stanford on Teme, Worcestershire through his marriage to Elizabeth, third and youngest sister and coheir of Edward Salwey.

The baronetage was created on 15 February 1755 for Edward Winnington (great-grandson of Sir Francis), subsequently Member of Parliament for Bewdley. The second Baronet represented Droitwich in the House of Commons and the third Baronet Droitwich, Worcestershire and Bewdley. The fourth Baronet sat as Liberal Member of Parliament for Bewdley. The fifth Baronet was High Sheriff of Worcestershire in 1894, and the seventh Baronet occupied the same office in 2015.

Winnington baronets, of Stanford Court (1755)
Sir Edward Winnington, 1st Baronet (–1791)
Sir Edward Winnington, 2nd Baronet (1749–1805)
Sir Thomas Edward Winnington, 3rd Baronet (c. 1780–1839)
Sir Thomas Edward Winnington, 4th Baronet (1811–1872)
Sir Francis Salwey Winnington, 5th Baronet (1849–1931)
Sir Francis Salwey William Winnington, 6th Baronet (1907–2003)
Sir Anthony Edward Winnington, 7th Baronet (born 1948)

Extended family
Charles William Winnington-Ingram (1850–1923), grandson of the Reverend Edward Winnington-Ingram, second son of the second Baronet, was a Rear-Admiral in the Royal Navy. His son Reginald Pepys Winnington-Ingram was Professor of Greek at King's College, London. Herbert Frederick Winnington-Ingram, youngest son of the aforementioned Reverend Edward Winnington-Ingram, second son of the second Baronet, was also a Rear-Admiral in the Royal Navy.

Another grandson of the Reverend Edward Winnington-Ingram was Arthur Winnington-Ingram, Bishop of London from 1901 to 1939. His younger brother Edward and his nephew (Edward's son) Arthur were both priests who became Archdeacons of Hereford.

Notes

References

Kidd, Charles, Williamson, David (editors). Debrett's Peerage and Baronetage (1990 edition). New York: St Martin's Press, 1990.

Further reading
 – "The Winningtons eventually sold Stanford Court in 1949, although Sir Francis Winnington Bart. had already moved to Brockhill Court, Worcestershire in 1944 when he married Anne Dury-Lowe at the end of the War"

Winnington
1755 establishments in Great Britain